Crystal Kiang (born April 12, 1990) is a Taiwanese-American former figure skater who competed internationally for Taiwan in ladies singles. She is a two-time (2010 and 2013) Taiwanese national champion and competed in the free skate at five Four Continents Championships, placing a career-best 15th in 2013.

Personal life 
Kiang was born on April 12, 1990, in New York City, New York. She is currently a skating coach located in New York, often teaching her students at the Andrew Stergiopoulos ice rink in Long Island. He other hobbies include ballet and music.

Skating career 

Kiang started skating at the age of five in 1995. She made her international debut at the 2008 Four Continents Figure Skating Championships in Goyang, South Korea, representing Taiwan.

During the 2008–2009 season, Kiang competed at her first Junior Grand Prix event in Madrid, Spain. Later that season, she competed at the 2009 Four Continents Figure Skating Championships in Vancouver, British Columbia, Canada.

During the 2009–2010 season, she competed at the Four Continents Figure Skating Championships in Jeonju, South Korea where she placed 18th. Later that season, she competed at the 2010 World Figure Skating Championships in Turin, Italy, which was her first World Championships competition.

During the 2010–2011 season, Kiang competed at the 2011 Four Continents Figure Skating Championships in Taipei, Taiwan.

During the 2011–2012 season, Kiang competed at two international competitions in Europe. They were the 2011 Finlandia Trophy in Vantaa, Finland and 2011 Merano Cup in Merano, Italy. She later competed at the 2012 Four Continents Figure Skating Championships in Colorado Springs, United States.

During the 2012–2013 season, Kiang competed at the 2012 Asian Figure Skating Trophy in Taipei, Taiwan where she finished 7th. She then competed at the 2012 U.S. International Figure Skating Classic in Salt Lake City, United States where she placed in the top ten.

Competitive highlights

Programs

References

External links 

 

Taiwanese female single skaters
Living people
1990 births
Sportspeople from New York (state)
American sportswomen
Competitors at the 2013 Winter Universiade
21st-century American women